Wallachian Roma or Vlax refers to a Romani community that migrated from what is today Romania (Wallachia) to Southeastern Europe (the Balkans) in the 18th and 19th centuries to escape the slavery in Romania. They speak Vlax Romani.

In Hungary (where they are known as Vlashika or Olah), they migrated from Romania as part of the "Kelderara" migration wave, and are subdivided into the Lovara, Bougeshti, Drizdari and others. They are related to the Kalderash of the Balkans. They are far smaller than the Hungarian Roma (known as Romungri), who mainly speak Hungarian.
In Serbia (where they are known as Vlaški cigani), they migrated from Romania. They have converted to Eastern Orthodoxy and mostly speak Serbian fluently.

References

Roma (Romani subgroup)
Romani groups
Romani in Hungary
Romani in Serbia
Vlax